HD 200044 (HR 8044) is a solitary star in the equatorial constellation Delphinus. It has an apparent magnitude of 5.7, allowing it to be faintly seen with the naked eye.

HD 200044 has a spectral classification of M3 IIIab, indicating that its an ageing red giant.  It is currently on the asymptotic giant branch and is fusing hydrogen and helium in shells around an inert carbon core. As a consequence, it has expanded to 58 times the radius of the Sun and is now radiating with a luminosity over 500 times greater than that of the Sun. HD 200044's large size and high luminosity yield an effective temperature of 3,707 K, giving it a red glow. HD 200044 is suspected to be a variable star with an amplitude of 0.05 magnitudes.

However, the separation is increasing due to HD 200044's high proper motion.

References

Delphinus (constellation)
M-type giants
Asymptotic-giant-branch stars
200044
103675
8044
BD+18 4675